Wickie may refer to:

 Gus Wickie (1885–1947), singer and voice actor
 Vicky the Viking (Wickie und die starken Männer), 1974 and 2009 film
 Lighthouse keeper